Aaron Laraman (born 10 January 1979) is an English cricketer. He is a right-handed batsman and a right-arm medium-fast bowler.

Born in Middlesex, Laraman began his career by playing for Middlesex County Cricket Club in 1998, though he also appeared in one youth Test match for England in 1997 before playing his debut match, managing another twelve months later.

Though he made his first-class debut in 1998, it was not until 2001 that he made his County Championship debut, in an innings defeat of Derbyshire. Despite moving in 2003 to Somerset, he was quickly included as a part of the Somerset first team. Laraman was a lower-order batsman with an overall first-class average with the bat and with the ball of just over thirty.

Laraman has played for Hertfordshire in the Minor Counties Championship. In 2007 he scored 512 runs at 56.88 and finished as the fourth highest runscorer in the championship.

References

1979 births
English cricketers
Living people
Middlesex cricketers
Somerset cricketers
Hertfordshire cricketers